The men's 50 metre pistol competition at the 2014 Asian Games in Incheon, South Korea was held on 20 September at the Ongnyeon International Shooting Range.

Schedule
All times are Korea Standard Time (UTC+09:00)

Records

Results

Legend
DNS — Did not start

Qualification

Final

References

ISSF Results Overview
 Qualification result
 Final result

External links
Official website

Men Pistol 50